Iurie Țap (born 3 October 1955) is a Moldovan politician.

He has been a member of the Parliament of Moldova since 2009.

External links 
 Iurie ŢAP
 IURIE ŢAP
 Site-ul Parlamentului Republicii Moldova
 Site-ul Partidului Liberal Democrat
 Lista PLDM la anticipate

1955 births
Living people
Moldova State University alumni
20th-century Moldovan historians
Moldovan MPs 2014–2018
Liberal Democratic Party of Moldova MPs
Moldovan MPs 2009–2010
Deputy Presidents of the Moldovan Parliament